Sverre Zachariassen (21 June 1919 – 9 March 2002) was a Norwegian footballer. He played in one match for the Norway national football team in 1945.

References

External links
 

1919 births
2002 deaths
Norwegian footballers
Norway international footballers
Association footballers not categorized by position